is a Japanese actor. He is best known for his role as Kaito in the 2014 romance film Still the Water, which was selected to compete for the Palme d'Or at the 2014 Cannes Film Festival. Murakami's role as an undercover in Last of the Wolves (2021) received critical acclaim, and earned him a Best Supporting Actor nomination at the 45th Japan Academy Film Prize. He also gained international popularity for his role as Shuntaro Chishiya in Netflix's survival drama Alice in Borderland (2020–2022).

Early life and career
Murakami was born on March 17, 1997, in Tokyo, Japan. He is the only son of actor Jun Murakami and singer Ua. His parents divorced when he was nine years old and he grew up with his mother, stepfather, and three younger half-siblings. While still attending preparatory school, he moved to Okinawa with his family. Murakami also studied for some years in Montreal, Canada.

He debuted in 2014 portraying the main role of Kaito in the award-winning film Still the Water, for which he received the Best Newcomer Award at the 29th Takasaki Film Festival. In 2015, he debuted in the television series Tenshi no Naifu. Later that same year, he starred in the live-action adaptation of the anime series Anohana: The Flower We Saw That Day, as well as the film Wasurenai to Chikatta Boku ga Ita.

As a voice actor, he is best known for voicing Hiro Shishigami in the anime adaptation of the manga series Inuyashiki.

Filmography

Film

Television

Awards and nominations

References

External links
 Official website 
 

1997 births
Living people
Male actors from Tokyo
Japanese male film actors
Japanese male television actors
Japanese male voice actors
Male voice actors from Tokyo
21st-century Japanese male actors